Kersting is a surname. Notable people with the name include:

Anthony F. Kersting (1916-2008), British architectural photographer
Georg Friedrich Kersting (1785–1847), German painter
Sachiko Furuhata-Kersting (born 1975), Japanese concert pianist
Walter Maria Kersting (1889–1970), German architect and industrial designer

See also
Kersting-Modellbauwerkstätten, a defunct German motor manufacturer